Andrei Vladimirovich Kovalenko (born 4 January 1972) is a Russian professional football coach and a former player. He is an goalkeepers coach for FC Veles Moscow.

External links
 

1972 births
People from Vozhegodsky District
Living people
Soviet footballers
Russian footballers
Russian Premier League players
FC Asmaral Moscow players
FC KAMAZ Naberezhnye Chelny players
FC Volgar Astrakhan players
Association football goalkeepers
FC Neftekhimik Nizhnekamsk players
FC FShM Torpedo Moscow players
Sportspeople from Vologda Oblast